General elections were held in Romania between 1 and 3 March 1922. In the first stage between 1 and 3 March, seats in the Senate were elected. In the second stage between 5 and 7 March the Chamber of Deputies was elected, and in the third and final stage from 9 to 11 March, additional Senate seats were elected. The result was a victory for the governing National Liberal Party, which won 222 of the 372 seats in the Chamber of Deputies and 111 of the 148 seats in the Senate. Both houses were combined to form a Constitutional Assembly, which approved the 1923 constitution.

Campaign
In 34 of the 121 constituencies in Transylvania, candidates ran unopposed and were proclaimed elected without an actual poll, mostly because the National Liberal government refused to register opposition candidates. Overall, the campaign was dominated by the government through what some opposition representative deemed "terror". The National Liberals freely used the administration and the Army in order to promote its candidates and intimidate the opposition, rejected the registration of many opposition candidates while pressuring others into withdrawing, destroyed opposition publications, forbade or brutally dissolved opposition rallies, arrested candidates and worked to split the vote among the competing opposition parties.

Government pressure continued during election day. According to Constantin Stere, army officers in Bessarabia campaigned for the government inside the polling stations and entered voting booths to ensure a vote for the government. According to Nicolae Iorga, government agents beat up opposition supporters in Fălticeni, Dorohoi and Odobești, prevented whole villages from voting in the Putna County, while in Argeș County the soldiers voted instead of the public. In several places across the country, opposition candidates were prevented from voting. Opposition leaders condemned the abuses of the government, with Romanian National Party leader Iuliu Maniu declaring the elections "a European scandal" and initially refusing to take part in the works of the newly elected Parliament.

Results

Chamber of Deputies

Senate

References

Parliamentary elections in Romania
Romania
1922 in Romania
Romania
Electoral fraud in Romania
Election and referendum articles with incomplete results
1922 elections in Romania